Yadir Meneses Betancur (born 1 April 2000) is a Colombian footballer who currently plays as a midfielder for Envigado.

Career statistics

Club

Notes

References

2000 births
Living people
Colombian footballers
Colombia youth international footballers
Association football midfielders
Envigado F.C. players
Categoría Primera A players
Sportspeople from Antioquia Department